Battalus is a genus of Australian corinnid sac spiders first described by Ferdinand Karsch in 1878. Originally placed with the ground spiders, it was moved to the Corinnidae in 2015.

Species
 it contains thirteen species:
Battalus adamparsonsi Raven, 2015 — Australia (Queensland, New South Wales, Victoria)
Battalus baehrae Raven, 2015 — Australia (South Australia)
Battalus bidgemia Raven, 2015 — Australia (Western Australia, Queensland)
Battalus boolathana Raven, 2015 — Australia (Western Australia)
Battalus byrneae Raven, 2015 — Australia (Tasmania)
Battalus diadens Raven, 2015 — Australia (Queensland, New South Wales, Victoria)
Battalus helenstarkae Raven, 2015 — Australia (South Australia)
Battalus microspinosus Raven, 2015 — Australia (Western Australia, South Australia)
Battalus rugosus Raven, 2015 — Australia (Western Australia, South Australia)
Battalus semiflavus (Simon, 1896) — Australia (Queensland)
Battalus spinipes Karsch, 1878 — Australia (Queensland)
Battalus wallum Raven, 2015 — Australia (Queensland, New South Wales)
Battalus zuytdorp Raven, 2015 — Australia (Western Australia)

References

Araneomorphae genera
Corinnidae